Badin railway station (Sindhi: بدين ريلوي اسٽيشن) is located at Badin, Sindh,  Pakistan.

Services
The following trains stop at Badin station:

See also
 List of railway stations in Pakistan
 Pakistan Railways

References

Further reading
 Bullo, Momin. Badin: History Unfolds 

Railway stations on Hyderabad–Badin Branch Line
Railway stations in Badin District